is a Japanese professional baseball pitcher of the Nippon Professional Baseball (NPB). He previously played for the Tokyo Yakult Swallows, the Hokkaido Nippon-Ham Fighters, and the Fukuoka SoftBank Hawks.

Professional career

Tokyo Yakult Swallows

On October 24, 2013, Akiyoshi was drafted  by the Tokyo Yakult Swallows in the 2013 Nippon Professional Baseball draft. 

On April 1, 2014, Akiyoshi debuted in the Central League against the Hiroshima Toyo Carp as a starting pitcher. On Mayl 13, he pitched against the Yomiuri Giants and recorded his first win. 

During the 2014-2018 season with the Swallows, he contributed to the team as a setup man. In all, he pitched in 283 games with a 19–17 Win–loss record, a 2.68 ERA, a 67 Holds, a 34 Saves, and a and a 274 strikeouts in 298.2 innings.

On July 16, 2016, Akiyoshi was named an All-Star and pitched in the 2016 Mazda All-Star Game 2016.

Hokkaido Nippon-Ham Fighters
December 11, 2018, Akiyoshi and Ryota Yachi were transferred to the Hokkaido Nippon-Ham Fighters in a 2-2 trade with Hirotoshi Takanashi and Kengo Ohta.

On April 12, 2019, he recorded his first save since joining the Fighters. 

Akiyoshi played the 2019-2021 seasons with the Hokkaido Nippon-Ham Fighters, he contributed to the team as a Closer. In all, he pitched in 96 games with a 1–6 Win–loss record, a 4.04 ERA, a 11 Holds, a 37 Saves, and a and a 84 strikeouts in 91.1 innings.

On November 16, 2021, he elected free agency following the 2021 season.

Fukui Nexus Elephants
On January 31, 2022, Akiyoshi signed with the Fukui Nexus Elephants of the independent league Nihonkai OCEAN League.

He recorded 18 Games pitched, a 1–2 Win–loss record, a 2.66 ERA, a 7 Saves, and a 35 strikeouts in 20.1innings.

Fukuoka SoftBank Hawks
On July 19, 2022, Akiyoshi signed with the Fukuoka SoftBank Hawks. On August 3, he made his debut as a pitcher for the Hawks. He pitched in only two games in the Pacific League in the 2022 season.

On October 17, 2022, the Hawks announced he was a free agent.

International career
On February 15, 2016, Akiyoshi represented the Japan national baseball team at the Samurai Japan Warm-up Game Japan vs Chinese Taipei.

January 24, 2017, he was elected to the Japan national baseball team at the 2017 World Baseball Classic.

References

External links

 Career statistics - NPB.jp
 49 Ryo Akiyoshi PLAYERS2022 - Fukuoka SoftBank Hawks Official site

1989 births
Living people
Fukuoka SoftBank Hawks players
Hokkaido Nippon-Ham Fighters players
Japanese baseball players
Nippon Professional Baseball pitchers
Baseball people from Tokyo
Tokyo Yakult Swallows players
2017 World Baseball Classic players